Rabbi Dr. Yakov Meir Nagen (born June 17, 1967; Hebrew: יעקב מאיר נגן) is an Israeli rabbi and author. Nagen is a leader in interfaith peace initiatives between Judaism and Islam and in encounters between Judaism and Eastern religions. He is the Director of the Blickle Institute for Interfaith Dialogue and the Beit Midrash for Judaism and Humanity. Nagen also teaches at Yeshivat Otniel and has written extensively about Jewish philosophy and Talmud.

Biography

Early life
Nagen was born in Manhattan, New York to Ahuva and Azriel Genack. After completing high school in the United States, he studied in Israel at Yeshivat Shaalvim. Nagen returned to the US to study at Yeshiva University where he received a bachelor's degree in Judaic studies and a master's degree in Jewish history in addition to rabbinic ordination. In 1993 he moved to Israel and studied at Yeshivat Har Etzion and in 1997 joined the faculty at Yeshivat Otniel.

In 2004 Nagen received a doctoral degree in Jewish philosophy at the Hebrew University. His dissertation dealt with the interplay between Halacha and Aggada, Kabbala and philosophy in the context of the holiday of Sukkot. Nagen's interdisciplinary approach towards Talmudic literature is developed his books: "Water, Creation and Revelation – Sukkot in the philosophy of halacha (Geloy, 2008) and "The Soul of the Mishna - a literary reading and search for meaning" (Dvir, 2016)

Interfaith activity
In 2006, Nagen traveled to India in the context of his research about the relationship between Judaism and eastern spirituality. Nagen see Judaism as incorporating elements both of Eastern and Western philosophy, as he presents in his book "Waking up to a new day – a renewed reading of Torah and life" (Maggid, 2013). In 2019 the book appeared in English as "Be, Become, Bless – Jewish Spirituality between East and West" (Maggid). Nagen is a leader in interfaith encounters in Israel and the Palestinian Authority between Jewish and Muslim leaders. In wake of his colleague, Rabbi Menachem Froman, Nagen believes that as religion is at the heart of the problem in the conflicts in the Middle East, religion must also be part of the solution.

Through the Interfaith Encounter Association (IEA) he coordinates a group of West Bank rabbis that meet regularly with Muslim sheikhs and imams, mostly from the Hebron and Ramallah areas. He is the co-chairman of the board of the Abrahamic Reunion (AR). The Abrahamic Reunion composes of representatives of four Abrahamic religions - Jews, Muslims, Christians and Druze - dedicated to promoting peace in the Middle East. Nagen was a representative of the organization at the World Parliament of Religions in 2015 at Salt Lake City. Nagen is also active in the United Religions Initiative (URI), and was one of Israel's representatives at the annual conference for the Middle East, held in Jordan in November 2017.

A photograph of Nagen hugging Haj Ibrahim Ahmad Abu el-Hawa appeared in Google's "Year in Search 2014" 

After the murder of the Dawabsheh family in Duma, Nagen was an organizer of the prayer vigil for the victims and outcry against the violence.

In March 2016 Nagen visited Al-Azhar University in Cairo and Fayyum to promote mutual respect between Islam and Judaism.

In 2016 Nagen was profiled in Tablet Magazine as one of the 10 "Israeli Rabbis You Should Know". Nagen is active in spreading Judaism in China in the context of the "Shofer from Zion" organization. Many of his writings have been translated into Chinese and in 2017 he gave lecture series in Beijing and Shanghai.

In 2020 Nagen was appointed as the director of the Ohr Torah Stone network's Blickle Institute for Interfaith Dialogue and the Beit Midrash for Judaism and Humanity.

In 2022 a compendium of the research in the Beit Midrash for Judaism and Humanity, was published as “His Name is One – Healing the Relationship between Judaism and World Religions". The book creates a new paradigm for Judaism’s halakhic and philosophical approach toward other religions.

Nagen is also a member of the Tzohar and Beit Hillel organizations, rabbinical organizations that focus on the relations between the religious and secular communities in Israel.

Personal life
In 1993 Nagen married Michal, head of the Tzahali pre-army seminary and daughter of Professor Uriel Simon. The couple lives in Jerusalem and have seven children.

Published works 
 2007 "The Soul of the Mishna - window to the inner world of the Mishna", Geloy (in Hebrew)
 2008 "Water, Creation and Revelation – Sukkot in the philosophy of halacha, Geloy (in Hebrew)
 2013 "Waking up to a new day – a renewed reading of Torah and life", Maggid (in Hebrew)
 2016 "The Soul of the Mishna - a literary reading and search for meaning", Dvir (in Hebrew)
 2019 "Be, Become, Bless – Jewish Spirituality between East and West", Maggid (in English)
 2019 "Life as Story - Seeing the World with New Eyes", Geloy (in Hebrew)
 2020 "The Soul of Mishna", Maggid (in English)
 2021 "Loving the World - Stories of Judaism and Humanity", Geloy (in Hebrew)
 2022 "His Name is One – Healing the Relationship between Judaism and World Religions", Maggid (in Hebrew)

External links 
 For West Bank rabbi, a rare and risky trip to Cairo’s ivory tower of Islam, April 15, 2016
 Walking the Green Line - ‘Isaac and Ishmael are brothers’ – Otniel yeshiva and The Field, Gush Etzion bloc, Winter 2015, Haaretz
 Scholarship Needs Spirituality, Spirituality Needs Scholarship: Challenges for Emerging Talmudic Methodologies, October 7, 2013
 We are all God's children, ynet, October 9, 2014
 Yakov Nagen, The Abrahamic Union: A confederate solution to the Israeli-Palestinian conflict, times of israel, May 29, 2017
 Yakov Nagen, From Other to Brother: Tales of Ramadan from Hebron and Jerusalem, times of israel, June 16, 2017
 Yakov Nagen, Religion and Reconciliation on the Temple Mount/Al Aqsa, times of israel, Aug 27, 2017
 interview with Professor Alan Brill about Judaism and Eastern Spirituality, September 3, 2019
 Peace will only come when the faiths of Jews and Arabs are acknowledged, The Jerusalem Post, September 22, 2020
 Yakov Nagen, The evolving Jewish-Christian-Muslim trialogue, times of israel, February 21, 2021
 Yakov Nagen, It’s time to heal Jewish-Arab relations in Israel, times of israel, Aapril 4, 2021
 Yakov Nagen, For God’s sake, Islam and Judaism can make peace, times of israel, May 23, 2021
 Yakov Nagen, Rosh Hashanah: Closing a circuit of life and love, times of israel, September 3, 2021

References 

Israeli rabbis
1967 births
Living people
Religious Zionist Orthodox rabbis
Yeshiva University alumni
Hebrew University of Jerusalem alumni